This is a summary of the electoral history of Chris Hipkins, Prime Minister of New Zealand, Leader of the Labour Party (2023–present), and Member of Parliament for Remutaka (2008–present).

Parliamentary elections

2008 election

2011 election

2014 election

2017 election

2020 election

Notes

References

Hipkins, Chris
Chris Hipkins